Thomas Joseph Thyne (born March 7, 1975) is an American actor, best known for his role as Dr. Jack Hodgins in the television series Bones from 2005 to 2017.

Life 
Thyne was born on March 7, 1975, in Stoughton, Massachusetts. He lived in Brockton, Hanover, and Hanson, before his family began moving around the country.

Thyne attended East Ridge Middle School in Ridgefield, Connecticut, before moving south to attend high school in Plano, Texas. He went on to attend the USC School of Dramatic Arts, graduating in 1997. In 2001, he co-founded Theatre Junkies, a group offering workshops and professional development for actors in the Greater Los Angeles Area.

In 2013, he became engaged to model Leah Park. As of 2019, he is single.

Filmography

Television

Films

Video games

References

External links
 
 

1975 births
Living people
20th-century American male actors
21st-century American male actors
American male film actors
American male television actors
Male actors from Massachusetts
USC School of Dramatic Arts alumni